Brian Michael Crosby (born December 5, 1982) is an American politician from the Democratic Party and is a member of the Maryland House of Delegates representing District 29B.

Background 
Crosby was born in Clifton Heights, Pennsylvania. He graduated from Monsignor Bonner High School in Drexel Hill, Pennsylvania in 2001. He attended Drexel University, where he received a B.A. in business administration. Crosby later attended Western Michigan University Cooley Law School where he received his J.D. and was admitted to the Pennsylvania Bar and New Jersey Bar in 2008. Starting in 2011, Crosby served in the U.S. Army after completing Officer Candidate School. While in the Army, he completed the Infantry Officer Leadership Course, Ranger School, and Airborne School and deployed to Afghanistan three times. He currently serves as a Captain in the Maryland Army National Guard.

In September 2017, Crosby announced his candidacy for the Maryland House of Delegates in District 29B, seeking to challenge incumbent Republican Delegate Deb Rey. He defeated Rey in the general election with 53 percent of the vote, or by a margin of about 700 votes.

In the legislature 
Crosby was sworn in as a member of the Maryland House of Delegates on January 9, 2019. In 2021, House Speaker Adrienne A. Jones appointed Crosby to serve as vice chair of the Economic Matters Committee, succeeding Delegate Kathleen Dumais.

Committee assignments
 Vice-Chair, Economic Matters Committee, 2021–present (member, 2019–present; banking, consumer protection, & commercial law subcommittee, 2019–2020; property & casualty insurance subcommittee, 2019–2020; public utilities subcommittee, 2022–present; vice-chair, workers' compensation subcommittee, 2021–present)
 Member, Rules and Executive Nominations Committee, 2021–present
 Member, Joint Committee on Cybersecurity, Information Technology, and Biotechnology, 2019–2020

Other memberships
 Vice-Chair, Southern Maryland Delegation, 2019–present
 Member, Maryland Legislative Transit Caucus, 2019–present

Political positions

Education
Crosby supports the Blueprint for Maryland's Future, a sweeping education reform bill passed by the legislature during the 2020 legislative session that would provide schools with $3.8 billion a year for 10 years. He criticized a bill introduced that year that would allow teachers to carry guns in schools, later calling it the "dumbest policy in American history. Teachers sign up to teach. They don't sign up to go through combat trauma."

During the 2022 legislative session, Crosby voted for a bill that would prevent school boards from discriminating against people on the basis of race, ethnicity, color, religion, sex, age, national origin, marital status, sexual orientation, gender identity, or disability; the bill passed the House of Delegates by a vote of 94-36 and the Senate by a 34-13 vote, and became law without the governor's signature. During a debate on the bill, Crosby voted against an amendment that would have blocked public schools from discussing gender and sexuality in the classroom. The amendment failed by a 37-95 vote. He also voted against an amendment that would prohibit transgender students from competing on girls' sports team in schools, which was defeated in a 42-91 vote.

Elections
In September 2020, Crosby criticized the Maryland State Board of Elections for only having one early voting center in his county for the 2020 United States presidential election.

During the 2021 legislative session, Crosby introduced legislation that would require elections for county commissioners to only be decided by voters within the districts in which the candidate is running. The bill later passed the House of Delegates by a vote of 95-39. He also proposed legislation that would require buses on fixed routes to stop at early voting centers during elections, which passed the House of Delegates by a vote of 104-32.

Energy
Crosby supports expanding the Calvert Cliffs Nuclear Power Plant.

Gun control
In 2020, Crosby voted in favor of legislation that would require additional background checks on secondary firearm transfers.

Marijuana
In 2019, Crosby said that he would support a ballot referendum on legalizing marijuana.

Policing
During the 2021 legislative session, Crosby introduced legislation that would require the Maryland Department of State Police to give body-worn cameras to all on-duty officers by 2022.

Social issues
During the 2020 legislative session, Crosby introduced legislation that would abolish daylight saving time in Maryland. The bill was reintroduced in the 2021 and 2022 legislative sessions.

During the 2022 legislative session, Crosby voted for a bill that would expand abortion access by providing $3.5 million to train nurse practitioners, physician assistants, and midwives to perform abortions in Maryland.

Taxes
During the 2022 legislative session, Crosby introduced legislation to exempt diapers from the state sales tax, and another bill to exempt baby bottles and infant car seats from the state's sales tax. Both bills passed unanimously and were signed into law on April 1, 2022.

Electoral history

References

Democratic Party members of the Maryland House of Delegates
People from Clifton Heights, Pennsylvania
Drexel University
Western Michigan University Cooley Law School alumni
Maryland lawyers
21st-century American politicians
Living people
1982 births